Wayne Shaw may refer to:

 Wayne Shaw (safety) (born 1974), Canadian Football league player
 Wayne Shaw (linebacker) (born 1939), former Saskatchewan Roughriders player
 Wayne Shaw (footballer) (born 1972), English goalkeeper
 Wayne Shaw (politician), American politician.